Rebecca Jackson may refer to:
Rebecca Jackson (politician), American politician from Kentucky
Rebecca Jackson (presenter) (born 1982), British television presenter, racing driver, entrepreneur, and motoring journalist
Rebecca Cox Jackson (1795–1871), married name Rebecca Jackson, African-American free woman; religious activist and autobiographer
Rebecca D. Jackson (born 1955), medical researcher, medical practitioner and professor of endocrinology, diabetes and metabolism
Rebecca Jackson Mendoza (born 1973), Australian actress, singer and dancer
Becky Jackson, fictional character in Glee